The Pyasina is a river in Krasnoyarsk Krai, Russia. The Pyasina River originates in Lake Pyasino and flows into the Pyasino Gulf of the Kara Sea. The river freezes up in late September or early October and stays under the ice until June. It is connected to the river Chetyrekh through its right distributary Staritsa.

History 
The Dvina merchant Kondratiy Kurochkin reached the mouth of the Pyasina in 1610. In 1614, an ostrog was built on the river to collect yasak from the natives. In 1935, before the Dudinka-Norilsk railway had been built, the river Pyasina and Lake Pyasino were used to deliver cargo to the site of the future city of Norilsk.

Taimyr reindeer herd

The calving grounds of the Taimyr reindeer herd, a migrating tundra reindeer (R.t. sibiricus), the largest reindeer herd in the world,  is along the right bank of the Pyasina and at the bend of the middle flow of the Agapa.

See also
Ambarnaya, an inflow of Lake Pyasino
List of rivers by discharge
List of rivers of Russia

References 

Rivers of Krasnoyarsk Krai
Drainage basins of the Kara Sea
North Siberian Lowland